Börtlingen is a municipality in the district of Göppingen in Baden-Württemberg in southern Germany.

Geography
Börtlingen belongs to the marginal zone of the metropolitan region of Stuttgart.

Geographical location
Börtlingen is located in the Schurwald in 334-498 meters above sea level, in a straight line about 6 km north of the county town Göppingen.

Municipality arrangement
To Börtlingen belongs the village Börtlingen, the two Weiler Breech and Zell, the courts Ödweiler and Schweizerhof and the house Schneiderhof and the proofs of former village Oedweiler.

Population development 
The development between 1837 and 2010.

Source: Statistical Office Baden-Württemberg Stuttgart

Economy and Infrastructure

Transportation
Börtlingen is accessible via the B 297 and the county road K 1408 from Lorch and Göppingen. Local roads lead to Zachersmühle and Oberwälden and about the Kaisersträßle to Adelberg and Oberberken.
There is also a bus service to and from Göppingen. 
In earlier times Börtlingen was connected to the rail network by the former  Hohenstaufenbahn (Schwäbisch Gmünd - Göppingen). The station Adelberg-Börtlingen however was located 3.5 km from the town center.

Education
With Paul Roth-school Börtlingen has its own primary school, there is also a Protestant kindergarten . Schools can be reached in Rechberghausen and Göppingen.

Buildings
Located in the upper part of Börtlingen is the St. John's Church, which was inaugurated in 1202. The original late Gothic building of the present church was built in 1500 and was later in the 18th century probably modeled in Baroque style .

Between the district Breech and Rattenharz, at the county road K 1408 ( 48 ° 46 '10 "N, 9 ° 38' 29" O is the Reinhold Maier-tower. The observation tower, a former shuttle water tower has a height of about 25 m and can be seen from Börtlingen. It was built in 1914 and was until 2008 in use as a water tower. It could be obtained as a tower by the initiative of the mayor and some citizens.

Freeman
Georg Ganzenberg (born July 14, 1914, died  December 22, 2006) was for many years the teacher in Börtlingen and a founding member and honorary member of several associations of Börtlingen.

References

Göppingen (district)